Vidče is a municipality and village in Vsetín District in the Zlín Region of the Czech Republic. It has about 1,700 inhabitants.

History
The first written mention of Vidče is from 1310.

Sights
There are two cultural monuments in Vidče. The small wooden belfry is from the 18th century and has a bell from 1775. The Church of Saints Cyril and Methodius was built in the neo-Gothic style in 1908–1914 and was consecrated in 1920.

References

External links

Villages in Vsetín District